In enzymology, a prunasin beta-glucosidase is an enzyme that catalyzes the chemical reaction

(R)-prunasin + H2O  D-glucose + mandelonitrile

Thus, the two substrates of this enzyme are (R)-prunasin and H2O, whereas its two products are D-glucose and mandelonitrile.

This enzyme belongs to the family of hydrolases, specifically those glycosidases that hydrolyse O- and S-glycosyl compounds.  The systematic name of this enzyme class is prunasin beta-D-glucohydrolase. This enzyme is also called prunasin hydrolase.

References

 

EC 3.2.1
Enzymes of unknown structure